Daniel Currams (born 1989) is an Irish hurler and Gaelic footballer who plays as a midfielder and centre-forward for the Offaly senior teams.

Born in Kilcormac, County Offaly, Currams first arrived on the inter-county scene at the age of sixteen when he first linked up with the Offaly minor teams as a dual player, before later joining the under-21 hurling side. He made his senior hurling debut during the 2008 championship before later joining the football side during the 2012 championship. Since then Currams has been a regular member of the hurling team, and has won one National League (Division 2) medal.

As a member of the Leinster inter-provincial team on a number of occasions, Currams has won one Railway Cup medal. At club level he is a one-time Leinster medallist with Kilcormac–Killoughey. In addition to this he has also won three championship medals.

His uncle, Liam Currams, was a dual All-Ireland medallist with Offaly.

Honours

Team

Dublin Institute of Technology
All-Ireland Freshers Hurling Championship (1): 2008

Kilcormac–Killoughey
All-Ireland Senior Club Hurling Championship (1): 2012
Offaly Senior Hurling Championship (1): 2012, 2013, 2014 (c)

Offaly
National Hurling League (Division 2) (1): 2008

Leinster
Railway Cup (1): 2014

Individual
Awards
Offaly Junior Footballer of the Year (1): 2012

References

 

1987 births
Living people
Dual players
Kilcormac-Killoughey hurlers
Kilcormac-Killoughey Gaelic footballers
Offaly inter-county hurlers
Offaly inter-county Gaelic footballers
Leinster inter-provincial hurlers
People from County Offaly